Ornette! is the seventh album by alto saxophonist and composer Ornette Coleman, released in February 1962 on Atlantic Records. The album features Scott LaFaro in place of Charlie Haden, who had left the Quartet but would work again with Coleman in the future.

The recording session took place on January 31, 1961, at Atlantic Studios in New York City. Three outtakes from the session, "Proof Readers," "Check Up," and "The Alchemy of Scott LaFaro" would later appear respectively on the 1993 box set Beauty Is A Rare Thing, and on 1970s compilations Twins and The Art of the Improvisers.

The titles of the compositions are initialisms derived from works by Sigmund Freud: Wit and its Relation to the Unconscious, Totem and Taboo, Civilization and its Discontents, and the essay Relation of the Poet to Day Dreaming.

Reception

The authors of the Penguin Guide to Jazz Recordings awarded the album 3 stars, and wrote that the track titles were presumably the result of an effort to ground Coleman "in the psychoanalysis-obsessed Zeitgeist but of course it also lent weight to those who thought that Ornette's music and musical philosophy were for the couch rather than the concert hall or club." They note that LaFaro "drives the group on, a more forceful and harmonically challenging player than Haden."

In a review for AllMusic, Brian Olewnick commented that Coleman is found "plumbing his quartet music to ever greater heights of richness and creativity... The cuts... are all gems and serve as wonderful launching pads for the musicians' improvisations... Coleman, by this time, was very comfortable in extended pieces, and he and his partners have no trouble filling in the time, never coming close to running out of ideas... Ornette! is a superb release and a must for all fans of Coleman and creative improvised music in general."

Writing for Pitchfork, Alex Linhardt stated: "Throughout, Coleman is seductive and charming, sometimes venturing into brief moments that could pass as showtunes. Fortunately, there's always enough skronks to stave off monotony or mawkishness. Tones are preserved, whether fragile or booming, before being called off at the brink of shrillness. It's another impressive, comfortable record by someone who knows that racket extraordinarily well. It may not quite match the audacity and shock value of Free Jazz, but when you've just razed the scaffolds of structured music, it's probably as good as you're going to get"

Track listing
All compositions by Ornette Coleman.

Side one

Side two

Personnel 
 Ornette Coleman — alto saxophone
 Don Cherry — pocket trumpet
 Scott LaFaro — bass
 Ed Blackwell — drums

References

Ornette Coleman albums
1961 albums
Atlantic Records albums
Free jazz albums
Avant-garde jazz albums